Al-Qatt Al-Asiri (also called nagash painting or majlis painting), is a style of Arabic art, typically painted by women in the entrance to a home. It originated in the 'Asir Region of Saudi Arabia where the front parlour of traditional Arab homes typically contained wall paintings in the form of a mural or fresco with geometric designs in bright colors. Called nagash in Arabic, the wall paintings are often considered a mark of pride. In 2017 Al-Qatt Al-Asiri was inscribed on UNESCO's list of Intangible Cultural Heritage of Humanity.

Women’s artwork
Women in the Asir region are traditionally responsible for plastering and painting the walls, corridors, and ceilings of their homes. A family’s wealth is often signified by the skill, color, and complexity of the paintings, with poorer homes decorated in basic straight, simple lines in red, green, yellow, and brown. Women within the same neighborhood sometimes compete to make the most vivid and extravagant designs.

Women's artwork is heavily influenced by their love for music, their view of culture and general perception of life; for example, the artwork of more conservative women is more likely to feature conservative and modest colors.

The interior walls of the home are brightly painted, employing defined patterns of lines, triangles, squares, diagonals and tree-like patterns. The geometric designs and heavy lines seem to be adapted from the area’s textile and weaving patterns.

Women from the region sometimes sell miniature 'Asiri houses as souvenirs and bric-à-brac, which are popular among Saudi city-dwellers, who find these colorful houses a source of wonder.

Airport art
The Saudi provincial airport in Abha reflects the region's cultural heritage. Airport Director Abdul Aziz Abu Harba said that "the seating arrangement at the airport lounge has been in the form of a traditional majlis and the walls are painted in various colors reflecting the natural beauty of Asir".

References

Arabic art
Visual arts genres
Intangible Cultural Heritage of Humanity
Interior design
Islamic architectural elements
Painting techniques
Saudi Arabian art
Saudi Arabian culture
Murals
Women and the arts
Women in Saudi Arabia